William Chapman is a former association football player who represented New Zealand at international level.

Chapman scored the first of his 2 international goals on his full All Whites debut in a 2–4 loss to Australia on 5 June 1933 and played a total of four A-internationals, all against Australia, his final cap an appearance in a 1–7 loss on 4 July 1936.

References 

Year of birth missing (living people)
Living people
New Zealand association footballers
New Zealand international footballers

Association footballers not categorized by position